Laddville (or "Laddsville") is a former settlement in the western Livermore Valley of Alameda County, California. 

It was located east of the settlement which eventually became Livermore.

History
A hotel was started in 1855 by Alphonso Ladd, and the community that grew up surrounding the hotel became Laddville. When the railroad was built through the Livermore Valley in August 1869, the station was placed west of Laddville near the nascent Livermore. Through growth the city limits of Livermore came to extend over the site of Laddville.

See also

List of cities and towns in California

References

External links
Laddsville history and photos, eLivermore.com website

Former settlements in Alameda County, California
Livermore Valley
Neighborhoods in Livermore, California
Populated places established in 1855
1855 establishments in California